Krezip is a Dutch pop, rock, and alternative music band from Tilburg, Netherlands, formed in 1997. Krezip's members formed a cover band while in the midst of highschool, and were still remarkably young when they broke through, playing all original songs, at the nationally televised Pinkpop festival, in 2000.

The band has since had several successful albums and numerous hit singles in the Netherlands, as well as live success, playing at festivals in Belgium and Germany. The band has four consistent core members, centered around front woman, lead singer and song writer Jacqueline Govaert.

In 2008, Krezip's breakthrough single "I Would Stay" was given a once-only, people's choice based award for "All-time best Dutch single", by Dutch national radio station 3FM.

In 2008, Krezip again made headlines in the Netherlands, announcing their 2009 break-up, at an average age of just 27, and by that time having been active for twelve years. In 2009, they played at the prominent Pinkpop festival again, before their official goodbye concerts.

In 2019, the band rejoined, and performed at Pinkpop again. In total, Krezip played at Pinkpop a record six times, a record only shared by Dutch rock and pop star Anouk.

History

Formation and demos (1997–1999) 
Krezip began as a four-piece outfit in 1997 in Tilburg, Netherlands, consisting of Jacqueline Govaert on vocals, Anne Govaert and Annelies Kuijsters on guitar and Joost van Haaren on bass guitar. Though these four formed the core of the band, they found it difficult to find a suitable permanent drummer. Thijs Romeijn eventually became the band's permanent drummer.

In 1998, Krezip, armed with two demo tapes, played many festivals in the Netherlands, such as Festival Mundial, Noorderslag, and Lowlands. Studies and age made obtaining commercial offers difficult. In 1999, they released an independent EP, Run Around.

Nothing Less (2000–2001)
The band soon received numerous offers from record companies. In 2000, they signed with Warner Music and recorded their first album, Nothing Less, with the producer Oscar Holleman. Their first single, "Won't Cry", did little to advance their career. The band gained more exposure after a show at the Dutch Pinkpop festival, with the ballad "I Would Stay" being received exceptionally well. The song was released as their second single, with a video compiled from footage of the Pinkpop show. "I Would Stay" reached #2 in the Top 40 of the Netherlands.

Nothing Less entered the charts at #26 in the Netherlands and climbed to #1, going 3× platinum. Despite this, the two other singles from the album, "All Unsaid" and "Everything and More", failed to chart. Among others, Krezip received a 2001 Edison Award,  the Dutch equivalent of the Grammy Awards.

The band toured continuously on the album, though towards the end of the tour, problems began to arise. Govaert began to lose her voice, while Kuijsters experienced severe pains in her hand that stopped her from playing shows without painkillers. After the tour, Govaert needed an operation on her vocal cords, while Kuijsters was diagnosed as simply not being "made" to play guitar.

Days Like This (2002–2003)
Despite a delay due to writer's block, the band released Days Like This in 2002. The album was certified gold (35,000 copies) later that year, and though the album was not as successful as its predecessor, it had several successful singles ("You Can Say" (#18), "Promise" (#16) and "Mine").

A club tour supported the album in the Netherlands, including acoustic performances in theaters. A performance for The Box TV program Pure was recorded live and released on DVD and CD called That'll Be Unplugged. The band liked the unplugged shows at first, but over time, decided to stay with rock music. Krezip also spent time promoting the album in Germany. They did two tours there and they were the supporting act for Bon Jovi in the Netherlands and supported Sheryl Crow during her tour of Germany and France.

Around this time Bram van den Berg replaced Thijs Romeijn on drums and Jan Peter Hoekstra replaced Thomas Holthuis on guitar.

Release from record label and What Are You Waiting For? (2004–2006)

While the band wrote new songs, Warner Music forced Warner Music Benelux to drop all of its national artists, including Krezip.

After leaving Warner, Krezip received many offers from other record labels. After careful deliberation, they chose to sign with Sony BMG. In a speech during the 2004 TMF Awards, Krezip thanked their old label for everything that they had done. The band flew to Los Angeles to collaborate with the American producers Wizardz of Oz, writing most of their new album there.

On 9 May 2005, Krezip released What Are You Waiting For?. The album entered the Dutch Album Top 100 at #1 and stayed in the chart for 27 weeks. Three singles were released. "Out of My Bed" was first. It peaked at #9, making it Krezip's second top 10 hit. Two other singles, "Don't Crush Me" (#22) and the ballad "I Apologize" (#30), failed to make it into the top 20.

In early 2005, Krezip traveled to Ethiopia at the request of charity foundation Novib for an education campaign. The journey was recorded and shown on the Dutch version of MTV. The band also went on toured Benelux, selling out 15 big venues.

The song "Same Mistake" was used in the Dutch movie Het Schnitzelparadijs (Schnitzel Paradise), which became a huge hit in the Netherlands. The band later noted that "Same Mistake" is the only Krezip song that has never been played live.

In 2006, Jacqueline joined several artists in the Netherlands to record the anthem for the 2006 TMF Awards. The song was performed live during the award show. The single became available for download to support the foundation Dance 4 Life - it peaked at #4 on downloads alone.

Plug It In (2006–2007)
In 2007, the band teamed up with the Swedish producers Adel Dahdal and Peter Mansson to record a new album. The band deliberately chose a drastically different sound, with disco influences and more electronica, and hence teamed up with various songwriters such as Felix Rodriguez and Jesper Anderberg of The Sounds among others. The album was recorded in two weeks, and on 11 May 2007 Krezip released Plug It In. On 6 February 2007 a Dutch radio station (3FM) played a rough version of the first single, "Plug It In & Turn Me On". The song was officially released in April 2007 and entered the Dutch Top 40 at the #39. While on tour, Krezip performed at Pinkpop Festival for the fourth time, replacing Amy Winehouse. The second single, "Play This Game With Me", was released after this show, with its music video using footage of the Pinkpop show. The song failed to chart. The third single, "All My Life", put the band back into the top 10, peaking at #7.

Ten-year anniversary and break-up (2007–2009)
On 17 August 2007, Jacqueline announced on Giel Beelen's radio show that Krezip would give a special concert on 29 December 2007, in the Heineken Music Hall (HMH) in Amsterdam to celebrate its tenth anniversary. A documentary was also filmed, showcasing the band's entire career until that point with narration by the band members. The band recorded a cover of The Korgis' song "Everybody's Got to Learn Sometime". The song was used in the film Alles is liefde. Later that year, the band re-released Plug It In with the track, a new song and a number of live tracks from the HMH concert.

The band continued to tour, eventually announcing that a best-of compilation would be released in December 2008. It included three new tracks, of which "Go To Sleep" and "Sweet Goodbyes" were released as singles. Originally, it had been implied that the band thought this a good point to release a retrospective. On 2 October, however, the band announced in Giel Beelen's radio show that they had decided to break up. On the band's Hyves account, they explained that a good time for them to quit was when they were at their peak.

The band finished the tour and played two farewell concerts in the HMH. The last concert was released on CD and DVD under the title Sweet Goodbyes.

Reunion and Sweet High (2019)
On 28 January 2019, news broke that Krezip would return to the stage for Pinkpop 2019. On 29 January 2019 they premiered their single "Lost Without You" on the Dutch TV show De Wereld Draait Door. On 8 June 2019 they released the follow-up single "How Would You Feel". On 24 October 2019 Krezip released the album Sweet High.

Any Day Now (2023)
On January 24th 2023, the band announced that they will release their sixth studio album Any Day Now. The album will be released on April 7th 2023; the album includes the singles "Make it a Memory" featuring Danny Vera, and "Ready For More".

On February 12, it was announced that drummer Bram van den Berg will fill in for  drummer Larry Mullen Jr. of Irish band U2 on their U2:UV concert residency at the MSG Sphere, which will start in late 2023, as he faces recovery from surgery.

Members
 Jaqueline Govaert – lead vocals, piano (1997–2009)
 Annelies Kuijsters – keyboards, synths, vocals (2001-2009), guitar (1997–2001)
 Anne Govaert – guitar, backing vocals (1997–2009)
 Jan Peter Hoekstra – guitar, backing vocals (2004–2009)
 Joost van Haren – bass (1997–2009)
 Bram van den Berg – drums (2005–2009)

Former members
 Thomas Holthuis – guitar (2001–2003)
 Thijs Romeijn – drums (1997–2004)

Discography

Albums

Studio albums

Compilation albums

Live albums

Video albums

Singles

Notes

References

General references
 10 jaar Krezip documentary

External links 

 
Krezip on Discogs.com

Musical groups from Tilburg
Musical groups established in 1997
Musical groups disestablished in 2009
Dutch rock music groups
1997 establishments in the Netherlands